Skamby is a village in Denmark, with a population of 435 (1 January 2022), in Nordfyn municipality on the island of Funen.

Notable people 
 Hans Peder Steensby (1875 in Steensby, near Skamby – 1920) an ethnographer, geographer and professor
 Petra Petersen (1901 in Nørre Højrup near Skamby – 1989) a Danish politician and an active member of the Danish resistance movement in World War II

External links
Nordfyn municipality

References

Cities and towns in the Region of Southern Denmark
Nordfyn Municipality